Rohovce is a village and municipality in the Dunajská Streda District in the Trnava Region of south-west Slovakia.

Geography
The municipality lies at an altitude of 123 metres and covers an area of 16.145 km².

History
In the 9th century, the territory of Rohovce became part of the Kingdom of Hungary. The village was first recorded in 1250 as Zerva. Until the end of World War I, it was part of Hungary and fell within the Somorja district of Pozsony County. After the Austro-Hungarian army disintegrated in November 1918, Czechoslovak troops occupied the area. After the Treaty of Trianon of 1920, the village became officially part of Czechoslovakia. In November 1938, the First Vienna Award granted the area to Hungary and it was held by Hungary until 1945. After Soviet occupation in 1945, Czechoslovak administration returned and the village became officially part of Czechoslovakia in 1947. Its Slovak name first became Velka Sarva, which was changed by the authorities to the current official name in 1948.

Demography 
In 1910, the village had 448, for the most part, Hungarian inhabitants. At the 2001 Census the recorded population of the village was 1037 while an end-2008 estimate by the Statistical Office had the villages's population as 1128. As of 2001, 87.66% of its population were Hungarians while 11.57% were Slovaks. Roman Catholicism is the majority religion of the village, its adherents numbering 86.50% of the total population.

References

External links
Local news selection

Villages and municipalities in Dunajská Streda District
Hungarian communities in Slovakia